Kapoche is a constituency of the National Assembly of Zambia. It was created in 2016, covering an area adjacent to the Mozambican border in Sinda District, Eastern Province.

List of MPs

References

Constituencies of the National Assembly of Zambia
2016 establishments in Zambia
Constituencies established in 2016